"Buenos Aires" is the second Japanese single by South Korean–Japanese girl group Iz*One. It was released in Japan by EMI Records on June 26, 2019.

Promotion
On May 3, was revealed that Iz*One would release their second Japanese single. "Buenos Aires" was released in 16 editions: two regular CD+DVD editions, a limited WIZ*ONE CD edition sold on Iz*One's official Japanese web store that comes with one photo and event participation, twelve CD member solo jacket editions that come with one member photo, and a CD box set edition that includes the WIZ*ONE edition and all member editions.

The music video teaser for "Buenos Aires" was released on May 27.

Track listing 
Physical releases include DVDs with music videos for the title track and one B-side. Credits adapted from Spotify.

All lyrics written and songs produced by Yasushi Akimoto.

Charts

Certifications

References

Iz*One songs
2019 singles
2019 songs
Songs with lyrics by Yasushi Akimoto
Billboard Japan Hot 100 number-one singles